The Super Heavyweight competition at the 2013 AIBA World Boxing Championships was held from 19–26 October 2013. Boxers were not limited to a maximum weight.

Medalists

Seeds

Draw

Finals

Top half

Bottom half

References
Draw

2013 AIBA World Boxing Championships